Anita Rocha da Silveira is a Brazilian filmmaker. She is best known for directing the films Kill Me Please and Medusa.

Life and career
Silveira was born and raised in Rio de Janeiro. In 2012, her short film The Living Dead (Os Mortos-Vivos), screened at the Cannes Directors' Fortnight. Her debut feature film Kill Me Please, premiered at the 72nd Venice International Film Festival in the Orizzonti section in 2015. Her second feature film Medusa, premiered at the Cannes Directors' Fortnight and Toronto International Film Festival in 2021.

Filmography

Awards and nominations

References

External links
 

Living people
Year of birth missing (living people)
Brazilian film directors

Brazilian women film directors